Point Avoid is a headland located at the south eastern extremity of both Coffin Bay Peninsula and Avoid Bay on the west coast of Eyre Peninsula in South Australia about  south west of the town of Coffin Bay. The point is currently located within the boundaries of the protected area, the Coffin Bay National Park.

References

External links
Point Avoid - Beachsafe
Point Avoid - Surfing Atlas

Headlands of South Australia
Eyre Peninsula